Gerhard P. Bassler is a German-Canadian writer and professor. He is a specialist in German and Canadian migration history. His book Vikings to U-Boats: the German Experience in Newfoundland and Labrador won the Rogers Cable Non-Fiction Award, which is a part of the Newfoundland Book Awards.

Life 
Bassler was born in Stuttgart, Germany in 1937. He earned a Ph.D in European and American history from the University of Kansas. He emigrated to Newfoundland in 1965. Bassler was a professor of history at the Memorial University of Newfoundland from 1965 to 2002. He became a professor emeritus at the Memorial University in 2003.

Works 

 The German Canadians 1750-1937: Immigration, Settlement, and Culture (1986)
 The German Canadian Mosaic Today and Yesterday: Identities, Roots, and Heritage (1991)
 Sanctuary Denied: Refugees from the Third Reich and Newfoundland Immigration Policy 1906-1949 (1992)
 Alfred Valdmanis and the Politics of Survival (2000)
 Vikings to U-Boats: the German Experience in Newfoundland and Labrador (2006)
 Escape Hatch: Newfoundland's Quest for German Industry and Immigration, 1950-1970 (2017)
 Develop or Perish (2017)

Awards 

 2007 Newfoundland and Labrador Book Award for Vikings to U-Boats: the German Experience in Newfoundland and Labrador
 Shortlisted for the 2018 Heritage and History Book Award for Escape Hatch: Newfoundland's Quest for German Industry and Immigration

References 

Living people
University of Kansas alumni
Academic staff of the Memorial University of Newfoundland
1937 births
Writers from Stuttgart